Bromotoluene is a group of three isomeric chemical compounds.  They (ortho-bromotoluene, meta-bromotoluene, and para-bromotoluene) consist of a disubstituted benzene ring with one bromine atom and one methyl group.

Properties 
The isomers differ in the location of the bromine, but have the same chemical formula.

Benzyl bromide is an isomer, which has a bromine substituted for one of the hydrogens of toluene's methyl group, and it is sometimes named α-bromotoluene.

Preparation
A laboratory route to p-bromotoluene proceeds from p-toluidine, which is diazotiized followed by treatment with cuprous bromide.

Uses
Bromotoluenes are precursors to many organic building blocks. For example, the methyl group may be oxidized using potassium permanganate to form the corresponding bromobenzoic acid.

See also
Chlorotoluene
Iodotoluene

References 

Bromobenzenes
Alkyl-substituted benzenes
Multiple compounds, tabular